Daraa District is a district (mantiqah) administratively belonging to Daraa Governorate, Syria. At the 2004 Census it had a population of 428,681. Its administrative centre is the city of Daraa.

Sub-districts
The district of Daraa is divided into eight sub-districts or Nāḥiyas (population according to 2004 official census):
Daara Subdistrict (ناحية درعا): population 146,481.
Bosra Subdistrict (ناحية بصرى): population 33,839.
Khirbet Ghazaleh Subdistrict (ناحية خربة غزالة): population 44,266.
Al-Shajara Subdistrict (ناحية الشجرة): population 34,206.
Da'el Subdistrict (ناحية داعل): population 43,691.
Muzayrib Subdistrict (ناحية مزيريب): population 72,625.
Al-Jiza Subdistrict (ناحية الجيزة): population 21,100.
Al-Musayfirah Subdistrict (ناحية المسيفرة): population 32,473.

References

 
Districts of Daraa Governorate